Risleya is a monotypic genus of flowering plants from the orchid family, Orchidaceae. The sole species is Risleya atropurpurea. It is native to the Himalayas of Sichuan, Tibet, Yunnan, Bhutan, India, Sikkim, Assam and Myanmar. It was previously included in the subtribe Malaxidinae but is now placed in the tribe Collabieae.

See also
 List of Orchidaceae genera

References

External links

Monotypic Epidendroideae genera
Collabieae
Orchids of China
Orchids of India
Orchids of Nepal
Orchids of Myanmar
Flora of East Himalaya
Flora of Assam (region)
Collabieae genera